Eye of the Needle is a spy thriller novel written by Welsh author Ken Follett. It was originally published in 1978 by the Penguin Group under the title Storm Island. This novel was Follett's first successful, best-selling effort as a novelist, and it earned him the 1979 Edgar Award for Best Novel from the Mystery Writers of America. The revised title is an allusion to the "eye of a needle" aphorism.

The book was made into a motion picture of the same title in 1981, starring Donald Sutherland, with a screenplay adapted by Stanley Mann and directed by Richard Marquand.

Plot summary 
In 1940, Henry Faber, a German spy nicknamed 'die Nadel' ('The Needle') due to his trademark weapon being a stiletto, is working at a London railway depot, collecting information on troop movements. Faber is halfway through radioing this information to Berlin when his widowed landlady stumbles into his room hoping for intimacy. Faber fears that Mrs. Garden will eventually realise that he was using a transmitter and that he is a spy, so he kills her with his stiletto, then resumes his transmission.

David, a trainee RAF pilot, and his bride Lucy are on their honeymoon when they're involved in a car crash. David loses the use of both his legs. Unable to fly during the Battle of Britain, David grows embittered and he and Lucy retire to the isolated Storm Island (fictitious) off the east coast of Scotland.  
  
Meanwhile, British Intelligence has executed or recruited all German spies except Faber. A widowed history professor, Godliman, and an ex-policeman, Bloggs, are employed by MI5 to catch him. They start with the interrupted broadcast and his codename Die Nadel. They connect the landlady's murder to Faber by him having used his 'needle' during the transmission. They then interview Faber's fellow tenants from 1940. One identifies Faber from a photo of him as a young army officer.

Faber is told by Berlin to investigate the First United States Army Group
(FUSAG) military base. He takes photos and discovers it is a dummy and has merely been constructed to look real from the air. Several soldiers try to arrest him but he kills them with his stiletto. Realising that FUSAG being fake implies that the D-Day landings will be in Normandy rather than around Calais, Faber heads for Aberdeen, Scotland, where a U-boat will take him and his photos back to Germany.

Godliman and Bloggs realise what Faber is trying to achieve and chase him across Northern England and Scotland. Faber escapes many times but his repeated killings allow MI5 to track him to Aberdeen. Both Hitler and Churchill are informed that Faber has the critical information.

In Aberdeen, Faber steals a small trawler and sets out to meet the U-boat. Caught by a fierce storm, he is shipwrecked on Storm Island, collapsing near the isolated house where David and Lucy live. Lucy nurses him back to health. Stuck in a loveless marriage to the crippled David, she begins a physical relationship with Faber. David soon discovers both Lucy's infidelity and Faber's FUSAG photos. David confronts Faber, but after a struggle Faber kills David by rolling him off a cliff, and tells Lucy it was another accident. However, she discovers her husband's body and realises the truth.

Faber realises he may be caught before leaving the island and so tries to radio the information about FUSAG directly to Germany. Lucy stops him by short-circuiting the electricity in the cottage. By the logic which had guided his actions throughout his career, Faber should have killed Lucy – but he finds himself unable to do so, being deeply in love with her to the detriment of his mission and of simple self-preservation. Unable to send a radio message, Faber attempts to descend the cliff and swim to the waiting U-boat. Lucy throws a rock down at him, striking him and causing him to lose his balance and fall to his death. An RAF patrol plane then appears and drives the U-boat away. A fictitious radio message is sent with Faber's call code, convincing the Germans that the invasion is targeting Calais. Bloggs comforts the widowed Lucy.

List of characters 
 Henry Faber – "Die Nadel", also called The Needle, a German spy
 David Rose – young RAF fighter pilot
 Lucy Rose – David Rose's wife
 Billy Parkin – young soldier who identified Faber
 Percival Godliman – history professor, recruited to MI5
 Frederick Bloggs – policeman, seconded to MI5

Inspiration
Operation Fortitude was an Allied counter-intelligence operation run during World War II. Its goal was to convince the German military that the planned D-Day landings were to occur at Calais and not Normandy. As a part of Fortitude the fictitious First United States Army Group (FUSAG) was created. FUSAG used fake tanks, aircraft, buildings and radio traffic to create an illusion of an army being formed to land at Calais. The controversial American General George S. Patton was given command of this 'army' which also influenced the German military. As Follet notes in the foreword to the novel, if the deception had been discovered the invasion of Nazi-occupied Europe would have become more difficult.

Film reference 

In the film The Iron Lady there is a scene in which the retired Margaret Thatcher is shown reading Eye of the Needle.

The Bollywood movie Fanaa is loosely based on the book, moved to a contemporary Indian location. The role of the German spy Faber being taken by a Kashmiri separatist militant seeking to gain a nuclear weapon, while the role of Lucy is given to a Kashmiri girl who loves the militant yet ends up killing him.

Another Bollywood movie Right Yaaa Wrong is also loosely based on the book.

Critical reception

On November 5, 2019, the BBC News listed Eye of the Needle on its list of the 100 most inspiring novels.

See also

 Operation Fortitude
 First United States Army Group (fictional)

References

External links
 Ken Follett's Eye of the Needle – official site
 Ken Follett discusses Eye of the Needle on the BBC World Book Club

1978 British novels
Novels by Ken Follett
Novels set during World War II
Edgar Award-winning works
Secret histories
British novels adapted into films
Aberdeen in fiction